Limbella is a genus of mosses in the family Amblystegiaceae. It contains the following species (but this list may be incomplete):
 Limbella fryei, (R.S. Williams) Ochyra
 Limbella tricostata, (Sull.) Müll. Hal. ex E.B. Bartram
 Limbella bartlettii
 Limbella conspissata
 Limbella limbata

References

Hypnales
Moss genera
Taxonomy articles created by Polbot